Assistant Secretary of the Army (Financial Management and Comptroller) (abbreviated ASA(FM&C)) is a civilian office in the United States Department of the Army.

The office of Assistant Secretary of the Army (Financial Management and Comptroller) grows out of a reorganization of the Department of the Army initiated in 1954 by United States Secretary of the Army Robert T. Stevens and largely designed by United States Under Secretary of the Army John Slezak.

The mission of the Assistant Secretary of the Army (Financial Management and Comptroller) is to formulate, submit, and defend the United States Army's budget to the United States Congress and the American public; to oversee the proper and effective use of appropriated resources to accomplish the Army's assigned missions; to provide timely, accurate, and reliable financial information to enable leaders and managers to incorporate cost considerations into their decision-making; to provide transparent reporting to Congress and the American public on the use of appropriated resources and the achievement of established Army-wide performance objectives; and manage and coordinate programs for the accession, training, and professional development of Army resource managers.

The Assistant Secretary of the Army (Financial Management and Comptroller) is Caral Spangler since August 17, 2021.

List of Assistant Secretaries of the Army (Financial Management and Comptroller), 1954—present (incomplete)

Deputy Assistant Secretaries
One Principal Deputy Assistant Secretary of the Army and three Deputy Assistant Secretaries of the Army roles reporting to the Assistant Secretary (ASA(FM&C)):
 Principal Deputy Assistant Secretary of the Army for Financial Management & Comptroller (PDASA-FM&C) – (non-career appointment)
 Deputy Assistant Secretary of the Army for Financial Operations & Information (DASA-FOI)
 Deputy Assistant Secretary of the Army for Cost & Economics (DASA-CE)
 Deputy Assistant Secretary of the Army for Budget (DASA-BU)

A Military Deputy also reports to the Assistant Secretary, with the grade of lieutenant general.

References

United States Army civilians